Mallika is a Hindi horror film, produced and directed by Wilson Louis. The film was released on 3 September 2010 under the Glorious Entertainment banner.

Plot
Whenever she closes her eyes, all Sanjana sees are a ghost staring at her in various states of blood and gore often prompting her to be scared all the time. When she awakens she can see them lying by her side.

Unable to sleep, she sees visions of a desolate mansion where she sees a swinging chair and most particularly about a store room. In one vision, she sees herself in a forest while being at home and where she follows the woman in white whom she sees as herself. After she is standing just a feet away, the ghost kills her with a dagger and the vision ends. Then, she decides to go to the mansion with her friends and boyfriend who mostly plays a violin.

There, a series of mysterious murders start to happen with her friends, with no clue over who did it. Then, Sanjana gets her most powerful vision where she sees the entire murder process that occurred before they even got there.

They seek the help of a Hindu priest who after listening her claims, researches and finds out about the murder. It is revealed that the ghost is none other than the owner of the mansion, "Mallika".And the murderer, Mallika's husband who was cheating with some other girl and reveals that he married her for her property soon left India after taking possession of the property.

Meanwhile, it was believed that Sanjana was the medium through which the murders occurred, as she is a lookalike of Mallika. The priest finds out that Sanjana is not the medium, so they decide to perform a ritual to find out about the medium.

It the mid sequence of the ritual, the vengeful ghost of Mallika appears and kills the priest. Then, Mallika's husband "Kaushik" comes to the mansion and sees Sanjana and takes her for Mallika. He says that he can kill another time too. There, he hears the violin tunes of Sanjana's boyfriend which are the same tunes as of Mallika. Then, he shows a ghostly face, proving that he is Mallika's medium. Flashback, reveals that he was the one who pulled out the blood stained dagger from its resting place. And was cut in the fingertip with her blood entering his body. After sometime, he was fully possessed.
He tortures Kaushik and Mallika leaves his body to kill him inside her dying place.

The hauntings and killings soon begin ending. And there is a hint for a happy ending.

Cast
 Sameer Dattani as Saahil
 Himanshu Malik as Vikram
 Rajesh Khera as Chandar
 Suresh Menon as Inspector P K Girpade
 Mamik Singh as Mr. Kaushik
 Bikramjeet Kanwarpal
 Sheena Nayar as Sanjana/Mallika
 Pooja Ballutia as Maya
 Arjun Mahajan as Maddy
 Farzil Pardiwalla as Bhim Singh
 Anirudh Agarwal as Samri

Music

References

External links
 Official Website
 Mallika at Bollywood Hungama

2010 films
2010s Hindi-language films
Films scored by Shamir Tandon
Films featuring songs by Pritam
Films set in country houses
Indian horror films
2010 horror films
Hindi-language horror films